Sheung Wo Hang is a Hakka village in Wo Hang, Sha Tau Kok, in the North District of Hong Kong. It is occupied by members of Hakka Li (李) Clan. Until the 18th century, the village was known as Wo Hang.

Administration
Sheung Wo Hang is a recognized village under the New Territories Small House Policy. It is one of the villages represented within the Sha Tau Kok District Rural Committee. For electoral purposes, Sheung Wo Hang is part of the Sha Ta constituency, which is currently represented by Ko Wai-kei.

History
Before the arrival of the Lis, Wo Hang was occupied by the Hos, the Tsangs and the Tangs. Lee Tak-wah, a member of the Lis, moved to Wo Hang in 1698, shortly after the end of the Great Clearance. Kuen-lam, son of Tak-wah, built an Ancestral Hall in the village. The feng shui of the hall was considered harmful to the Hos, the Tsangs and the Tangs and they left the village. Members of the Li Clan later branched out to found the two nearby villages of Ha Wo Hang ("lower Wo Hang") and Wo Hang Tai Long, in around 1730 and 1750 respectively. Wo Hang was subsequently renamed Sheung Wo Hang.

At the time of the 1911 census, the population of Sheung Wo Hang was 443. The number of males was 175.

Since the 1950s many inhabitants of the village have moved to urban areas in Hong Kong and abroad.

Built heritage
The Kang Yung Study Hall was built in the early Qing Dynasty by the Li Clan. The study hall was later converted into a public school, which closed in 1986. It is now a declared monument.

Other historical buildings include:
 Lee Sze Sai Kui Entrance Gate. Built in the 18th century. Not graded.
 Lee ancestral hall. Not graded.
 Wing Kat Tong, a communal hall, at No. 18A. Probably built before 1905. Not graded.

See also
 Walled villages of Hong Kong

References

Further reading

External links

 Delineation of area of existing village Sheung Wo Hang (Sha Tau Kok) for election of resident representative (2019 to 2022)
 Antiquities and Monuments Office. Hong Kong Traditional Chinese Architectural Information System. Sheung Wo Hang Tsuen

Walled villages of Hong Kong
Sha Tau Kok
Villages in North District, Hong Kong